{{Infobox newspaper
| name                 = The Concrete Herald
| school               = 
| logo                 = 
| logo_size            = 
| logo_alt             = 
| image                = First page of modern Concrete Herald.png
| image_size           = 
| image_alt            = 
| caption              = Front page of The Concrete Heralds January 2012 edition
| motto                = The Voice of the Upper Skagit Valley
| type                 = Monthly
| format               = Monthly Newspaper
| owner                = 
| founder              = F.J. Wilcox
| publisher            = Jason Miller
| president            = 
| editor               = Jason Miller
| chiefeditor          = 
| depeditor            = 
| assoceditor          = 
| maneditor            = 
| generalmanager       = 
| newseditor           = 
| managingeditordesign = 
| dirinteractive       = 
| campuseditor         = 
| campuschief          = 
| metroeditor          = 
| metrochief           = 
| opeditor             = 
| sportseditor         = 
| photoeditor          = 
| staff                = 
| foundation           = 
| political            = Republican 1901–1919 and 1946–1953; Independent 1920–1945 and 1954–1986
| language             = English
| ceased publication   = 1991
| relaunched           = 2009
| headquarters         = 137 Main St.Concrete, Washington, U.S.
| circulation          = 1700
| circulation_date     = 2016
| circulation_ref      = 
| readership           = Skagit County
| sister newspapers    = 
| ISSN                 = 
| oclc                 = 14574917
| RNI                  = 
| website              = 
| free                 = 
}}The Concrete Herald''' is a newspaper serving the town of Concrete, Washington, along with other communities in Skagit County in the United States. The newspaper has received multiple awards from the Washington Newspaper Publishers' Association, Washington State Press Club, and various other state and local organizations. The Herald publications have initiated various public projects in the area and played a key role in fighting industrial pollution in Concrete. The publication serves as a cohesive element for the community of the Upper Skagit Valley. Published as a weekly newspaper from 1901 until its dissolution in 1991, The Concrete Herald was relaunched as a monthly publication in 2009.The Concrete Herald was founded in Hamilton, Washington, in 1901, and moved to Concrete in 1913. After changing owners and editors several times, the newspaper entered a 40-year period of stability beginning in 1929, when it became owned and edited by Charles Dwelley. During this period, as Dwelley's editorials were picked up by other publications and quoted nationwide, the Herald recognition and subscription base expanded beyond Concrete into the Skagit Valley. After Dwelley's retirement, The Concrete Herald was purchased by Robert and June Fader, both experienced journalists. However, after Robert's premature death in 1985 and June's retirement in late 1989, the Herald was purchased by a local businessman unconnected to the publishing business, leading to the newspaper's demise in 1991. In 2009, after raising money from the local community, local resident Jason Miller revived The Concrete Herald in both paper and electronic form.

 History 
 Prior to the Great Depression 

The newspaper was founded on November 23, 1901, by F.J. Wilcox, under the name The Hamilton Herald, in Hamilton, Washington. Wilcox envisioned rapid industrial development of Skagit Valley, analogous to the development of the industrial region of Pittsburgh. As of 1902, the four-page newspaper was published every Saturday and proclaimed a Republican political affiliation. The industrialization of Skagit County fell below Wilcox's expectations, and in 1904 he sold the newspaper to an immigrant from Norway, Hans J. Bratlie, who also became its editor. Under Wilcox, the paper's yearly subscription price had remained $1.00, but in 1910, Bratlie raised it to $1.50.	

Bratlie operated the newspaper in Hamilton until 1913, when he moved it to Concrete, Washington and renamed it The Concrete Herald. At that time, Concrete's population was growing rapidly, boosted by two recently established Portland cement plants. Another weekly newspaper the Concrete Enterprise, had been operating in Concrete since 1908. Its owner/editor was the secretary of the Washington Newspaper Association, Louis L. Jacobin. The Enterprise also had a Republican affiliation,  and its yearly subscription was $1.00.	

Bratlie lowered The Concrete Herald subscription price to $1.00 and increased its size to six pages. In turn, Jacobin re-branded his paper as the Skagit Valley Enterprise, and later as the Skagit Valley News. The relationship between the two editors deteriorated into a feud.

By the end of 1914, both editors were seeking change. Planning his retirement, Bratlie invited Ralph J. Benjamin to invest into and edit The Concrete Herald, with an option to purchase controlling stakes in the paper. On March 9, 1915, however, the newspaper's three-story wooden building and most of its equipment were destroyed by a fire, and Benjamin had to abandon the paper, losing his investment. Bratlie's loss amounted from $7,000 to $9,000 (from $184,000 to $237,000 in 2021 dollars), according to different accounts, but he salvaged some supplies and one Linotype machine that survived the fire, and continued publishing. He installed W.J.S. Gordon, and later M.G. Flower, as temporary editors.

Meanwhile, the relationship between the competing editors—Jacobin and Bratlie's failed replacement, Benjamin—did not go well. Jacobin reportedly gloated about the fire victims. In turn, Benjamin authored a series of critical editorials attacking both cement plants of Concrete for dust pollution, which led to a loss of advertising revenue for his paper. As a result, in September 1916, Benjamin sold his rebranded Skagit Valley News to Mrs. N.I. Wolbert and purchased interest in another Washington local paper the Wilkeson Record, instead. The strain of World War I, as well as local competition, eventually led to the indefinite suspension of the Skagit Valley News, making the Herald the only newspaper in Concrete by August 1918.
   
Bratlie continued searching for his replacement, and by May 1917 he had engaged a well-known Everett printer, Jim G. Webster, to work on The Concrete Herald. In January 1918, Webster purchased the controlling share of the newspaper. The editor and co-owner was G.L. Leonard, an attorney by training and the elected school superintendent of Concrete. Bratlie remained a minority shareholder.

With its new leadership, the newspaper changed its political affiliation to Independent and increased its subscription to $1.50. Its paid circulation, however, fell sharply, from 870 subscribers in Bratlie's years to 330 in 1920. In 1922, circulation rebounded slightly to 462, and Webster sold his share in the newspaper to A.J. Collins. Bratlie retained his minority share and Leonard continued as editor.

Collins remained the owner of The Concrete Herald until his premature death during a fire in Concrete hotel. In July 1928, Leonard purchased Collins' share of the newspaper from his widow and became the sole owner of The Concrete Herald, but by 1929, the newspaper was in trouble and could not service mortgages on its building and equipment.

 Dwelley's years 

The Sedro-Woolley Publishing Company took control of The Concrete Herald by purchasing its debts in September 1929. Frank Evans, owner of the Sedro-Woolley Publishing Company and publisher of The Courier Times of Sedro-Woolley, was a member of the Service Committee of the Washington Press Association. He aspired to become a newspaper "magnate" acquire Washington newspapers.

A month before Black Tuesday's collapse of the stock exchange, Evans sent his assistant, Charles Dwelley, to Concrete to edit the newly acquired newspaper. The youngest editor in Washington State at the time,21-year-old Dwelley worked and lived with his pregnant wife in a wooden newspaper building and operated two 19th century Linotype machines for 9-point and 12-point fonts, so all headings needed to be set by hand. In later years, Dwelley stated that the reason Evans has chosen him for the job was that he was the only person in the Sedro-Woolley office who could operate both machines.

In March 1930, Evans and Dwelley jointly incorporated the newspaper. In 1935, during The Great Depression, Dwelley took a mortgage on Evan's share and became the sole owner of Herald. He took another mortgage on the building of a Ford garage on Main Street Concrete that had failed, and gradually renovated it into the new Concrete Herald office and print shop, with an apartment for his family on the second floor. By 1940, Dwelley had paid both mortgages.

Noted as one of very few "remarkable exceptions" to massive newspaper failures in the turbulent years of the Depression and World War II, The Concrete Herald survived under Dwelley and gradually became "one of the finest edited newspapers in the state." The Herald subscription base rose to include all of upper Skagit Valley, from Lyman in the west to Newhalem in the northeast. Dwelley's editorials were cited on the radio throughout the country, reprinted in nationwide publications such as Reader's Digest and The New York Times, and referred to among professional journalists as "Dwellisms." The newspaper and Dwelley personally received multiple awards and recognitions on state and national levels.

All three of Dwelley's spouses assisted with the Herald publication, and Dwelley's son, Art, worked as an apprentice at the Herald shop until September 1951. By this time, the Herald operation, one of the smallest of its kind, needed three people, and Miriam McGuire replaced Art as an assistant. A typical issue was six or eight pages. Type was set from Tuesday to Thursday, and on Thursdays, newly printed newspapers were folded by hand. The newspaper suspended its publication once, from Nov 2, 1944 to May 31, 1945, during the period Dwelley served in the US Navy during World War II.

 Protecting public interest 
Dwelley strongly believed that a newspaper's editor should have and voice his opinion, and his editorials often confronted local problems. For 40 years, Dwelley fought the Superior Portland Cement Company over the dust pollution it created in Concrete. Dwelley claimed that in 1929 and 1930, he withstood pressure from executives of Superior Portland Cement, who offered him "help" with editing the paper and insisted that his editorials should be cleared with the company's office prior to publication. Open confrontation concerning the dust pollution between Superior Portland Cement and the editor of Herald competitor in Concrete The Skagit Valley News, was a contributing factor in the demise of that newspaper in 1916. Eventually, a community group led by Dwelley successfully involved Senator Lowell Peterson in the issue, conducted a dust emission study that proved pollution levels more than 10 times over acceptable levels, and pushed for the creation of the Northwest Air Pollution Authority. Five days after the first meeting of the State Air Pollution Control Board, the Concrete plant operator decided to completely close the plant.

In 1956, The Concrete Herald was sued for libel by Jacob Koops, a police judge of the city of Lyman, Washington, in connection to Dwelley's editorial of July 17, 1955. The article alleged financial mishandling of the traffic fines by officials of Lyman for personal gain. At that time, a Washington State Supreme Court decision imposed serious limitations on criticism in newspaper columns. The affair dragged on for three years, making its way to court in June 1958. The Herald supplied witnesses who confirmed its claims, and the court acquitted the paper.

 Post-Dwelley years 
Dwelley retired and sold The Concrete Herald in September 1970, just past the 40-year anniversary of his editorship. The new owners of the newspaper, Robert and June Fader had experience in the newspaper business. For over 20 years, Robert Fader worked in and later co-owned The Anacortes American, a local newspaper published in Anacortes. June had previously worked as an assistant editor of The Skagit Valley Herald in Mount Vernon, and later as the news editor of The Whidbey News-Times of Oak Harbor.

June became The Concrete Herald editor. Robert was involved with Washington Newspaper Publisher's Association, and in August 1976, he was elected its treasurer. In 1985, June Fader stepped down, and Anne Bussiere was hired as Herald editor. Dwelley praised Bussiere's editorials in their personal correspondence.

Even though the population of Concrete continued to decline, the Herald subscription base continued to rise after Dwelley's retirement, increasing by 48% from 1970 to 1988. Robert Fader died of cancer in October 1985, at the age of 61. On December 31, 1989, June retired, selling The Concrete Herald to Margaret Walter from Mount Vernon and Mae Falavolito, a Concrete resident who had assisted with editing the newspaper since 1986. As of 1990, Mae Falavolito was listed as the single owner of the newspaper. June Fader's chief consideration was to leave the newspaper in the hands of local residents, but the local community was reportedly "shocked" when they learned that John Falavolito, an opportunistic businessman with no background in communications, was the actual owner.

The newspaper started to fail, and the new owners put it up for sale in the beginning of 1991. After several months of unsuccessful attempts to find a new buyer, The Concrete Herald stopped publication on September 5, 1991. Later that year, The Skagit Argus hired Bussiere and attempted to substitute The Concrete Herald with a special Concrete Argus edition, but the project was unsuccessful.

 Historical distribution 
Until 1991, the Herald subscription base covered a smaller area and was limited to the upper Skagit Valley, with dedicated sections on Birdsview, Marblemount, Newhalem, Rockport, and Van Horn. The Concrete Heritage Museum maintains a digital archive of the newspaper that is sponsored by Puget Sound Energy. However, many early issues of the newspaper were lost in a fire in 1915.

 Awards 

 The Herald revival 
In 2009, Concrete resident Jason Miller revived the newspaper in both paper and electronic formats. Miller raised over $10,000 from over 150 businesses and individuals in the community to fund the revival. Since 2009, The Concrete Herald has been published as a monthly tabloid. The successful resurrection of the paper version in the digital age came as a surprise for the publishing industry. The revival has reportedly "rejuvenated" Concrete, and The Concrete Herald continues to serve as a cohesive element for the community of the upper Skagit Valley.

 Distribution 
As of 2022, the distribution of the paper edition of Concrete Herald'' covers the Skagit County, Whatcom County, and Snohomish County cities, towns, and communities of Anacortes, Arlington, Bellingham, Birdsview, Burlington, Clear Lake, Concrete, Conway, Darrington, Day Creek, Deming, Glacier, Hamilton, La Conner, Lyman, Maple Falls, Marblemount, Newhalem, Rockport, Mount Vernon, and Sedro-Woolley, with a total circulation of 5,000 paper copies. The newspaper maintains dedicated sections covering local news from Darrington, Clear Lake, Concrete, Hamilton, Lyman, Marblemount, Newhalem, Rockport, and Sedro-Woolley.

Notes

References

Literature cited

External links 

 
 The Concrete Herald Archive

Publications established in 1901
Newspapers published in Washington (state)
Skagit County, Washington